Pulse 1 is an Independent Local Radio station based in Leeds, England, owned and operated by Bauer as part of the Hits Radio network. It broadcasts to West Yorkshire.

As of December 2022, the station has a weekly audience of 138,000 listeners according to RAJAR.

History

The station was part of the Yorkshire Radio Network which also owned Viking FM and Hallam FM, this was bought out by Newcastle based Metro Radio Group (owners of Metro Radio and TFM). Pennine Radio became Pennine FM in the late 1980s when the AM frequency was split off to create the original incarnation of Classic Gold. On 30 August 1991, in a bid to revive flagging fortunes, Pennine FM was rebranded as "The Pulse".

The Metro Radio Group itself was bought out by EMAP in 1996 and ownership rules at the time meant that as they already owned neighbouring Radio Aire in Leeds something had to be sold on, and that was The Pulse and its sister station Classic Gold which were purchased in a management buyout from senior staff and ex-Metro Group executives. The new company was called The Radio Partnership, it was at this time that the station moved to number one position in the West Yorkshire radio market for the first time in its history.

The Radio Partnership expanded over the years to include other stations, such as Signal Radio in Stoke-on-Trent. In 1999, Kelvin MacKenzie's Talk Radio UK bought The Radio Partnership and formed The Wireless Group to include the national broadcaster and a series of local stations. In July 2005 The Wireless Group was bought out by UTV Group. In September 2016, The Wireless Group was purchased by News UK.

On 8 February 2019, Pulse 1 and the Wireless Group's network of local radio stations were sold to Bauer.

In May 2020, Bauer announced that Pulse 1 would join the Hits Radio network, while retaining its on-air branding. Pulse 1 began carrying off-peak programming from the Hits Radio network on 15 June 2020 and the station officially joined the Hits Radio network on 20 July 2020.

In September 2020, Pulse 1 began broadcasting to the eastern part of West Yorkshire on DAB following the closure of sister station Radio Aire.

In March 2021, Bauer closed Pulse 1's Bradford studios and moved the station to the former Radio Aire studios in Leeds, co-locating with Greatest Hits Radio Yorkshire.

Service area
The main 102.5 FM signal comes from the Vicars Lot transmitter close to the M62 between Scammonden Dam and junction 23, close to the Scammonden arched bridge. This signal covers most of West Yorkshire, including eastern areas of the county such as Leeds, Wakefield, Castleford and Knottingley.

It can be heard as far south as Doncaster and Sheffield, and also to the west of the Pennines in Lancashire and Greater Manchester. The signal is much stronger, and the transmitter at a higher altitude than the Idle transmitter.

The 97.5 FM signal covers Bradford, and comes from the Idle transmitter, which is on the top of Idle Moor, between Idle and Shipley. The Idle transmitter also carries national radio frequencies, Capital Yorkshire on 105.6 FM, Sunrise Radio on 103.2 FM and Heart Yorkshire on 107.6 FM.

Programming 
Networked programming originates from Bauer's Manchester studios.

Local programming is produced and broadcast from Bauer's Leeds studios each weekday from 6–10 am, presented by Danny Mylo and Rosie Madison.

News
Bauer's Leeds newsroom broadcasts local news bulletins hourly from 6 am–7 pm on weekdays and from 7 am–1 pm on weekends. Headlines are broadcast on the half-hour during weekday breakfast and drivetime shows. The station simulcasts hourly Sky News Radio bulletins at all other times.

Henry Winter has presented Pulse 1's breakfast news bulletins since 2018. He also contributes to the 'Pulse 1 Breakfast Show with Mylo & Rosie'.

Former sport programming
Pulse 1 aired extensive local sports coverage, including live match commentaries on Bradford City matches, led by Jason Thornton and former City striker Ian Ormondroyd, and a weekly rugby league magazine show, presented by Bradford Bulls CEO Robbie Hunter Paul.

References

External links
 Pulse 1

Radio stations in Yorkshire
Mass media in Bradford
Radio stations established in 1975
Bauer Radio
Hits Radio